"Manohari" is an Indian Telugu-language item number from the 2015 soundtrack Baahubali: The Beginning from the film of the same name. The song is sung by Mohana Bhogaraju and L. V. Revanth and has its lyrics written by Chaitanya Prasad. The music video of the track features Prabhas, who plays Amarendra Baahubali, disguised as a Middle Eastern Man dancing with Scarlett Mellish Wilson, Nora Fatehi and Madhu Sneha Upadhyay in cameo roles, while Rana Daggubati as Bhallaladeva tries to catch the spy who was being followed by him and Amarendra Baahubali. Director SS Rajamouli has a cameo role as the bartender during the premise of the song. Nora Fatehi faced a wardrobe malfunction while shooting for the song.

Music video

Synopsis 
The song is played after Bahubali and Bhallaldeva visit Sighapura in search of a traitor known as Saketa. The song has been filmed originally in Telugu , with many part re-shot in Tamil.

Release
The audio of the song was released on 31 May 2015 along with other tracks in the album. The music video of the song was officially released on 20 July 2015 through the YouTube channel of T-Series Telugu. The video of the song received more than 18 million views on YouTube.

The song was released in Tamil as Manogari, In Hindi as Manohari and in Malayalam as Manohari.

Reception
Manohari received positive reviews from critics, IB Times writes, "Nora Fatehi, Scarlett Wilson, Gabriela Bertante sizzles in Rajamouli's Film.'"

References

Baahubali (franchise)
Telugu film songs
2015 songs
Macaronic songs
Pop-folk songs
Songs written for films
Indian songs
Songs with music by M. M. Keeravani